A chloride sulfite or sulfite chloride is a chemical compound that contains chloride and sulfite anions (SO32− Cl−). The known compounds of this type are all late transition metal sulfito complexes. Chlorine may be present as a ligand (chloro) or as an ion (chloride). The sulfito ligand can connect to the metal atom by way of an oxygen, or a sulfur atom. It can also link to the metal atom using two oxygen atoms as a bidentate ligand.

Chloride sulfites are not to be confused with the chlorosulfites, which are compounds containing the SO2Cl− ion or -SO2Cl group in organic compounds, where it is also called chlorosulfinate. The chlorosulfates also have the formula SO3Cl−  as a single ion, whereas chloride sulfites have three negative charges.

The mercury complex with formula ClHgSO3− is found in the acid gas scrubbers that purify pollution from smokestacks. However it decomposes and does not capture mercury in this application. This complex can form an ammonium salt: ammonium chlorosulfitomercurate(II) NH4[ClHgSO3], which decomposes over 130°C. The salt is formed from mercuric chloride and ammonium sulfite water solutions.

List

References

Transition metal compounds
Sulfites
Chlorides